A Yamaha Artist is a designation bestowed by Yamaha, by invitation, to musical artists, considered to be critically acclaimed in their instruments or genres. Acceptance as a Yamaha Artist is tantamount to a reciprocal endorsement by Yamaha.  Like other musical instrument manufacturers, Yamaha supports its artists in various ways.

History 
Yamaha's music artist program is managed by Yamaha Corporate Artist Affairs in Franklin, Tennessee.  There is also an office in New York City which exclusively handles Yamaha Artists in the classical music field, as relates to Yamaha Pianos and Yamaha Band and Orchestra instruments - namely those in the brass and woodwind families.  Other offices relating to Yamaha Guitars and Yamaha Drums are located in Buena Park, California.  The office in New York is known as Yamaha Artist Services, Inc., was founded in 1987, and serves the world of Yamaha classical piano artists.

Endorsement component 
Endorsements from product manufacturers, certainly in the case of musical instruments, requires a personal relationship between an artist and professional services representative.  Paraphrasing Peter Erskine, endorsement relationships go beyond providing free equipment, clinic support, advertising, logistical assistance, and the like.  The relationships are often very personal and depend on good communication.

Selected Yamaha Artists (past and present) 
Contemporary musical artists

 Don Alder
 James Blunt
 Paul Bostaph
 Michael Bublé
 Sheryl Crow
 Jamie Cullum
 Nathan East
 A Fine Frenzy
 Josh Groban
 Randy Jackson
 Bert Jansch
 Elton John
 Norah Jones
 Karmin
 Alicia Keys
 Barry Manilow
 Andrew Markworth
 Paul McCartney
 Sarah McLachlan
 Fernando Otero
 Phil Ramone
 Ryan Shore
 James Taylor
 Justin Timberlake
 U2
 Stevie Wonder

Jazz artists

 Geri Allen
 Lynne Arriale
 Aziza
 Tony Bennett
 Robi Botos
 Joanne Brackeen
 David Braid
 Alex Brown
 Dennis Burnside
 Cyrus Chestnut
 Billy Childs 
 Gerald Clayton
 Chick Corea
 Jamie Cullum
 Per Danielsson
 Tony DeSare
 Taylor Eigsti
 ELEW
 Matthew Fogg
 James Francies
 Jeff Franzel
 Mike Garson
 Benny Golson
 Gordon Goodwin
 Tom Grant
 Tamir Hendelman
 Nachito Herrera
 Henry Hey
 Hiromi
 Laurence Hobgood 
 Dick Hyman
 Bob James
 Jeff Lorber
 Marcus Johnson
 Florence K
 Michael Kaeshammer
 Milen Kirov
 Marcus Loeber (de)
 Bobby Lyle
 Keiko Matsui
 Giorgi Mikadze
 Andy Milne
 Eric Mintel
 Anthony Molinaro
 Dan Nimmer
 Johnny O'Neal
 Eddie Palmieri
 Konrad Paszkudzki 
 Danilo Perez
 Jean-Michel Pilc
 Alberto Pizzo
 Eric Reed
 David Rosenboom 
 Dan Siegel
 Edward Simon
 Jeremy Siskind
 Richard Sussman (de)
 Dan Tepfer
 Tony Tixier
 George Wein
 Kenny Werner
 Matthew Whitaker
 Eric Wortham II ‡

Classical and experimental musical artists

 James Adler
 Alexander Braginsky
 Cathal Breslin
 Sara Davis Buechner
 Costantino Catena
 Angelin Chang
 Frederic Chiu
 Vicky Chow
 Richard Danielpour
 Jarred Dunn
 JB Floyd
 Mark Gasser
 Peter-Lukas Graf
 Claire Huangci
 Byron Janis
 Olga Kern
 Alexander Kobrin
 Eduard Kunz
 Soyeon Kate Lee
 Alain Lefèvre
 Denis Matsuev
 Anne-Marie McDermott
 Alberto Nosè
 Ainobu Ota
 Arfon Owen
 Artur Pizarro
 Paul Posnak
 Awadagin Pratt
 Vassily Primakov
 Jerome Rose
 Nicholas Roth
 Maria João Pires
 Ory Shihor
 Jade Simmons
 Abbey Simon
 Mimi Stillman
 Mei-Ting Sun
 Kathleen Supové
 Alessandro Taverna
 Dan Tepfer
 Jennifer Thomas (pianist)
 Michael Tilson Thomas
 Phil Woods
 Oxana Yablonskaya

 ‡ Also classical

Yamaha Artist Services 
Yamaha offers Yamaha Artists Services in select cities that include Paris, Seoul, London, Tokyo, and Moscow.

Yamaha Artist Services Piano Salon in New York 

Yamaha Artist Services, Inc. (YASI) in Midtown Manhattan is the home of the Yamaha Artist Services Piano Salon at 689 Fifth Avenue at East 54th Street, northeast corner.  It features rehearsal space, recording space, performance space, a high end brass and woodwind workshop, and a concert bank of Bösendorfer and Yamaha pianos. Cyrus Chestnut recorded an album there.  Concerts and festivals rely on the support of the YASI. The space is also set up to broadcast live masterclasses and performances with audio and video, but through Disklavier technology, the actual live performance itself can be heard on a piano in a different space – in real time.

Selected initiatives involving Yamaha Artists 

Yamaha introduced the Yamaha Disklavier in 1987, a high-tech piano that has been widely used in teaching piano and music theory as well as composing and performances. Yamaha Corporation of America, Yamaha Canada Music Limited, and Yamaha Artists New York have sponsored national seminars for music educators and Yamaha Artists using the Disklavier.

See also
 Yamaha Artist Services, Inc.

Musical artists programs of other manufacturers 
 Steinway Artists
 Ludwig Drums Artists
 Bösendorfer Artists (wholly owned subsidiary of Yamaha since 2008)

See also 
 Artists and repertoire, as it relates to the management of performing artists
 Celebrity branding
 Brand ambassador
 Brand management
 Product placement
 Sports marketing
 Testimonial

References

External links
 Yamaha Corporate Artist Affairs, Inc.
 Website of Yamaha Artist Services, Inc.
 Yamaha Global Artist Relations

Artist
Music instrument endorsement lists